The 2009 Six Nations Championship, known as the RBS 6 Nations for sponsorship reasons, was the 10th Six Nations Championship, and the 115th international championship, an annual rugby union competition contested by the six major European national teams: England, France, Ireland, Italy, Scotland and Wales. The tournament was held between 7 February and 21 March 2009.

Ireland won the Grand Slam and Triple Crown, only their second Grand Slam, and first since 1948, and first Triple Crown since 2007. It was Ireland's second Grand Slam in total.

England finished as runners-up, and also won the Calcutta Cup. The tournament featured the first Friday night game in its history, played between France and Wales at the Stade de France.

Summary
The tournament began on 7 February 2009, when England hosted Italy in the earlier of the day's two matches. Ireland played France later that evening, with Scotland versus Wales the following day.

The reigning champions on entering the 2009 tournament were Wales, who won the Grand Slam and Triple Crown in 2008. The winners of both accolades in 2009 were Ireland, with Ronan O'Gara's dropped goal leaving the score in the final match against Wales in Cardiff on 21 March at 17–15. Wales's Stephen Jones then missed a late penalty from just inside the Ireland half to leave Wales in fourth position. Ireland's two tries in that match came when captain Brian O'Driscoll and Tommy Bowe scored in quick succession in the 44th and 46th minutes respectively. Paul O'Connell received the Triple Crown and Ireland's captain Brian O'Driscoll lifted the trophy. It was Ireland's first Grand Slam since 1948, 61 years earlier. This was achieved in the first Six Nations Championship since Declan Kidney was appointed as manager of the Ireland team, succeeding Eddie O'Sullivan who resigned after the previous tournament.

Twelve tries were scored by Ireland throughout the tournament, and five wins left the team on top of the table at the end of the Championship with ten points. They opened with a 30–21 win over France at home stadium Croke Park on 7 February. On 15 February, Ireland's second match was a 38–9 victory over Italy at the Stadio Flaminio in Rome. On 28 February, Ireland beat England 14–13 at Croke Park and on 14 March, Ireland beat Scotland 22–15 at Murrayfield Stadium. Then followed the Grand Slam against Wales on 21 March 2009. That game was attended by the President of Ireland Mary McAleese, who presented the trophy, and Taoiseach Brian Cowen. Following the game there were tributes from politicians including Brian Cowen, Leader of the Opposition Enda Kenny and Minister for Arts, Sport and Tourism Martin Cullen. A civic reception for the team took place outside Dublin's Mansion House on 22 March at 16:30, with 18,000 fans attending alongside Taoiseach Brian Cowen and Dublin's Deputy Lord Mayor Emer Costelloe. 2,000 fans had earlier greeted the team upon their arrival at Dublin Airport. Brian O'Driscoll described 21 March as a "sweet, sweet day". The game was watched by 945,000 people in Ireland, the highest rating television programme in the country by that stage of 2009. Former coach Eddie O'Sullivan was said to be "delighted" for the team. Brian O'Driscoll was named player of the tournament, beating Italy's Sergio Parisse and Ireland teammate Paul O'Connell. O'Connell was later named captain of the British and Irish Lions team to tour South Africa and containing fourteen members of the Grand Slam winning Irish team on 21 April 2009, describing it as "a great honour".

Italy were the only side to not win a match in the tournament, suffering defeats by twenty points or more against, in addition to Ireland, France (50–8), England (36–11) and Scotland (26–6), while losing 20–15 to Wales. Scotland managed a solitary victory against Italy to finish on 2 points. England, France and Wales all managed to win three of their matches to finish level on six points but England's points difference of +54 granted them second place in the table. Their points tally was boosted by a 36–10 defeat of France and a 26–12 win against Scotland which sealed the Calcutta Cup. Wales' early loss to France and narrow loss to Ireland in the last game of the tournament denied them a second consecutive championship. Although Wales needed to beat Ireland by more than 13 points to win the championship, they could have won the game and the Triple Crown in the last minute of the tournament (as well as denying Ireland the Grand Slam) if Stephen Jones' 50-yard penalty kick had not fallen short.

Participants
The teams involved were:

Squads

Table

Note: The first tiebreaker is point difference from all matches, the second is tries scored. After these two tiebreakers the championship is shared.

Fixtures
The fixtures for the 2009 Six Nations were released on 17 April 2008. The France v Wales game on 27 February was the first Friday night game in the history of the championship, both under the Five and Six Nations format.

Round 1

Round 2

Round 3

Ireland won the Millennium Trophy.

Round 4

Ireland won their eighth successive Centenary Quaich.

Round 5

France won their third consecutive Giuseppe Garibaldi Trophy.

England won the 121st Calcutta Cup.

Ireland claimed their first championship since 1985 and first Grand Slam since 1948.

Scorers

References

External links

2009 Six Nations Championship Coverage at the Guardian
2009 Six Nations Championship at ESPN
The official RBS 6 Nations website

 
2009 rugby union tournaments for national teams
2009
2008–09 in European rugby union
2008–09 in Irish rugby union
2008–09 in English rugby union
2008–09 in Welsh rugby union
2008–09 in Scottish rugby union
2008–09 in French rugby union
2008–09 in Italian rugby union
February 2009 sports events in Europe
March 2009 sports events in Europe
Royal Bank of Scotland